Cultural agility is a term employed in talent management to design a complex competency based on skills whose command allows an individual or an organization to perform successfully in cross-cultural situations. Cultural agility has been conceptualized as an individuals' ability to comfortably and effectively work in different cultures (e.g., countries, organizations) and with people from different cultures, national origins, generations, gender, etc.  People with cultural agility are able to "build trust, gain credibility, communicate, and collaborate effectively across cultures".  The concept appears to overlap with others such as cross-cultural competence and cultural intelligence. The subject has been linked to studying abroad, foreign talent acquisition, immigrants and refugees, career success, sports coaching, leadership development, and global business. Currently, the term is often associated with research carried out by Paula Caligiuri, and a few others like Marisa Cleveland, and Zeinab Shawky Younis. On psychological aspects, the command of cultural agility resources may be facilitated by personality traits like extraversion, openness, and predisposition to novelty seeking, but also by appropriate learning. Self-assessment has been pointed out as a practical approach to evaluate the level of competence reached by cultural agility trainees.

History 
Apart from its colloquial use, the term agility was proposed as a relevant concept to industry and business management in the 1990s by Steven L. Goldman, who published a volume on the subject. An early use of the full term (cultural agility) is found in a in a series of conferences by Terry Lee  named "Leadership for the New Millennium", in 1999. 

In recent times, the concept has been amply developed by Paula Caligiuri from Northeastern University and her co-authors, through many academic articles and books, now being widely used in academic literature. Other authors publishing books on agility as a main subject include Peter Gillies from TIAS School for Business and Society (Tilburg, Netherlands), and Guy Morrow, from the University of Melbourne, Australia.

Beyond academic circles, the term has gained popularity in mass media when commenting about the need for acquisition of intercultural skills to achieve adequate inclusion in the socioeconomic workings of an increasingly globalized world. A Cultural Agility Collaboration Group has been established by the University of Minnesota to facilitate developing inclusive, equitable, socially just spaces in campuses, and local communities.

Digitalization 
Digital technologies facilitate communication across cultures, and help overcome language barriers to some extent.

Localization 
Although adapting business practices to local cultural preferences may seem generally appropriate, detailed assessment of circumstances may reveal overall benefits from the use of countercultural practices on some occasions.

Training 
Opportunities to learn cultural agility theory and/or techniques appear to be growing through: 

 Self-assessment, and e-learning.
 Organizational courses
 Inclussion of CA themes and courses in university syllabuses
 Ad-hoc programs for personnel sectors

Further reading 
Recent papers

 Lazarova, Mila; Caligiuri, Paula; Collings, David G.; De Cieri, Helen (2023-01). "Global work in a rapidly changing world: Implications for MNEs and individuals". Journal of World Business. 58 (1): 101365. doi:10.1016/j.jwb.2022.101365. PMC 9229585
 Caligiuri, Paula; Caprar, Dan V. (2022-06-06). "Becoming culturally agile: Effectively varying contextual responses through international experience and cross-cultural competencies". The International Journal of Human Resource Management. 0 (0): 1–22. doi:10.1080/09585192.2022.2083918. ISSN 0958-5192
 Caligiuri, Paula; Sbaa, Maha Yomn; Milosevic, Mina; MacGregor-Peralta, Julia; Griffith, Richard (2022-12). "Assessing cross-cultural performance: beyond just "being there", revisited". International Journal of Cross Cultural Management. 22 (3): 413–431. doi:10.1177/14705958221135216. ISSN 1470-5958
Books
 Caligiuri, P. (2012). Cultural Agility: Building a Pipeline of Globally Successful Professionals. Jossey-Bass Publishing..
 Ferraro, G. P., & Briody, E. K. (2017). The cultural dimension of global business. Taylor & Francis. 
 Olivier, S., Hölscher, F., & Williams, C. (2020). Agile Leadership for Turbulent Times: Integrating Your Ego, Eco and Intuitive Intelligence. Routledge. 
The Agile Culture Code: A guide to organizational agility (1st ed., 2020).  BusinessVillage, .
 Caligiuri P.  Building Your Cultural Agility: The Nine Competencies of Successful Global Professionals. Kogan-Page Publishing, (2021, in press),

References

Human resource management
Cultural competence